The national flag of Austria is a triband in the following order: red, white, and red.

The Austrian flag is considered one of the oldest national symbols still in use by a modern country, with its first recorded use in 1230. The Austrian triband originated from the arms of the Babenberg dynasty. As opposed to other flags, such as the black-and-yellow banner of the Habsburgs, the red-white-red flag was from very early on associated, not with a reigning family or monarch, but with the country itself.

In addition to serving as the flag of Austria since 1230, it was adopted as the naval ensigns and flags of the Grand Duchy of Tuscany and Duchy of Modena and Reggio in the 18th and 19th centuries respectively, as both were ruled by cadet branches of the House of Habsburg.

History

Origins 

The flag traces back to the coat of arms of the medieval Babenberg dynasty, a silver band on a red field (in heraldry: Gules a fess Argent). The origin of the Bindenschild has not been conclusively established, it possibly derived from the Styrian margraves of the Otakar noble family, who themselves may have adopted the colours from the descendants of the Carinthian duke Adalbero (ruled 1011–1035), a scion of the House of Eppenstein extinct in 1122. However, the Babenberg margrave Leopold III of Austria (1095–1136) had already been depicted with a triband shield in 1105.

When the last Otakar Duke Ottokar IV of Styria died in 1192, the Styrian duchy was inherited by the Babenberg duke Leopold V of Austria according to the 1186 Georgenberg Pact. According to the 18th-century historian Chrysostomus Hanthaler, his grandson Duke Frederick II of Austria (1230–1246), nicknamed the "Quarrelsome" or the "Warlike", the last of the Babenberg dynasty, designed a new coat of arms in red-white-red after his accession—an attempt to prevail against reluctant local nobles and to stress his autonomy towards Emperor Frederick II. The triband is first documented in a seal on a deed issued on 30 November 1230, confirming the privileges of Lilienfeld Abbey. The medieval chronicler Jans der Enikel reports that the duke appeared in a red-white-red ceremonial dress at his 1232 accolade in the Vienna Schottenstift.

The Babenberg family colours developed to the coat of arms of their Austrian possessions. After the dynasty had become extinct with Frederick's death at the 1246 Battle of the Leitha River, they were adopted by his Přemyslid successor King Ottokar II of Bohemia. Upon the 1278 Battle on the Marchfeld the colours were assumed by the victorious House of Habsburg and gradually became the coat of arms of the dynasty's Hereditary Lands within the Habsburg monarchy.

Legend 

According to legend, the flag was invented by Duke Leopold V of Austria as a consequence of his fighting during the Siege of Acre. After a fierce battle, his white surcoat was completely drenched in blood. When he removed his belt, the cloth beneath remained unstained, revealing the combination of red-white-red. So taken was he by this singular sight that he adopted the colours and scheme as his banner. The incident was documented as early as 1260.

In fact, the war flag of the Holy Roman Empire during the Crusades was a silver cross on a red field quite similar to the later Austrian arms. This sign was used by the Austrian capital Vienna from the late 13th century onwards.

Habsburg Monarchy 

Since the days of Rudolph of Habsburg and the 1283 Treaty of Rheinfelden, the combination of red-white-red was widely considered to be the Austrian (later also Inner Austrian) colours used by the ruling Habsburg dynasty. However, the black-yellow flag was used as the national flag (in a modern sense) of the Austrian Habsburg monarchy, the later Austrian Empire and the Austrian part of Austria-Hungary, sometimes even for the entire empire as well, until 1918. These were the family colours of the Imperial House of Habsburg, and were themselves in part derived from the banner of the Holy Roman Empire.

Beginning in the reign of Emperor Joseph II, the Austrian, later Austro-Hungarian Navy used a naval ensign (Marineflagge) based on the red-white-red colours, and augmented with a shield of similar colours. Both of these flags became obsolete with Austria-Hungary's dissolution in 1918, and the newly formed rump state of German Austria adopted the red-white-red triband as its national flag.

Austrian flag coin
The Austrian flag has been the main motif of many collector coins. One of the most recent examples is the 20 euro Post War Period coin, issued by the Republic of Austria on 17 September 2003. The obverse of this coin shows the Austrian coat of arms flanked by the Austrian flag and the European Union flag.

Colours
The Constitution of Austria does not specify the colour shades of the flag, but members of the Austrian Armed Forces are told that the red on the coat of arms (which is used for the flag shield on the eagle) is Pantone 186 C.

The red-white-red Austrian flag is almost identical to several other flags found around the world, including the flags of Bouillon and Leuven in Belgium, the flag of Savona in Italy, the flags of Dordrecht, Gouda, Hoorn and Leiden in the Netherlands, and the flag of Puerto Asís in Colombia. The flag is said to have inspired the national flag of Lebanon and the Stars and Bars used by the Confederate States of America from 1861 to 1863 (and ancestor of the flag of the U.S. state of Georgia).

See also

 List of Austrian flags
 Flags of Austrian states
 Coat of arms of Austria
 Flag of Peru, similar design with vertical stripes

References

External links

Wappengesetz (law)
Seeschiffahrtsgesetz (law)
Flag of Austria-Hungary
The Symbols of Austria
Flag of Austria

Austria
 
National symbols of Austria
Austria
Austria
Austria